Marika Mikkola (born 24 August 1971) is a Finnish orienteering competitor and World champion. She won a gold medal at the 2001 World Orienteering Championships in Tampere and a silver medal in Västerås 2004 with the Finnish relay team. She also received an individual silver medal in 2001 and bronze medal in 2004 in the long distance event. Marika's clubs have been Reima-34, Espoon Suunta, Angelniemen Ankkuri, Bækkelagets SK, Espoon Suunta and Kalevan Rasti.

See also
 Finnish orienteers
 List of orienteers
 List of orienteering events

References

External links
 
 
 Marika Mikkola in Venla and Youth Jukola relay 1986- 

1971 births
Living people
Finnish orienteers
Female orienteers
Foot orienteers
World Orienteering Championships medalists